Óscar Antonio Ramírez Hernández (born 8 December 1964), is a Costa Rican former footballer who played as a midfielder and was most recently the manager of the Costa Rica national team.

During the first half of the 2010s, he managed Alajuelense in two separate stints. Regarded as the most successful manager in the club's history, he won five league titles. Shortly after his second departure, he was appointed as the head coach of the Costa Rica national team.

Club career
He played for the two teams in his country, Alajuelense and Saprissa, becoming a star and an idol for both teams' fans. He made his debut for Liga on 13 November 1983 against Ramonense and scored his first goal a week later against Municipal San José. With Alajuelense he won four national championships during the 1980s and early 1990s, as well as a CONCACAF Champions Cup in 1986.

During 1993's season, El Macho switched to Alajuela's arch-rival team Saprissa, causing a commotion on Liga's fans. With Saprissa, he won a total of three more national championships and two CONCACAF Champions Cup titles. In 1995, he moved to hometown club Belén but returned to Saprissa in 1997.

He retired in March 2000 when at second division Guanacasteca.

International career
Ramírez made his debut for Costa Rica in a February 1985 friendly match against El Salvador and earned a total of 75 caps, scoring 6 goals. He represented his country in 21 FIFA World Cup qualification matches and played at the 1990 FIFA World Cup held in Italy. He also played at the 1991 and 1997 UNCAF Nations Cups as well as at the 1991 CONCACAF Gold Cup and the 1997 Copa América in Bolivia.

He collected his final cap in an August 1997 World Cup qualifier against El Salvador.

International goals
Scores and results list Costa Rica's goal tally first.

Managerial career
After his retirement, Ramírez began working as Hernán Medford's assistant coach in Saprissa, winning in less than three years, a national championship, a UNCAF Cup title, and a CONCACAF Champions Cup title, thus earning a berth at the FIFA Club World Championship Toyota Cup.

As of 28 October 2006, the Costa Rican Football Federation announced that Medford and his coaching staff would take charge of the Costa Rica national football team. Thus making him the new assistant coach for the Costa Rica national football team.

In May 2010, Ramírez took charge of Alajuelense, assisted by his former World Cup teammate Mauricio Montero. He was voted Costa Rica manager of the year 2012,
but resigned in January 2013 only to return at the helm in May 2013.

In August 2015, Ramírez was appointed as Paulo Wanchope's assistant coach for the Costa Rica national team. However, a week after his appointment, Wanchope was involved in a fight in Panama and announced his departure from the national team. Ramírez was then appointed as head coach a week after. He led the team at the 2018 FIFA World Cup.

Managerial statistics

Club

International

Honours

Alajuelense
Ramirez is the most successful manager in the club's history winning five consecutive league titles and being Costa Rica manager of the year 2012.
Primera División de Costa Rica: Invierno 2010–11
Primera División de Costa Rica: Verano 2010–11
Primera División de Costa Rica: Invierno 2011–12
Primera División de Costa Rica: Invierno 2012–13
Primera División de Costa Rica: Invierno 2013–14

Individual Awards
Costa Rica manager of the year 2012
CONCACAF Coach of the Year: 2016

Others
At the beginning of his managerial career, Ramírez worked as Hernán Medford's assistant coach in Deportivo Saprissa, winning in less than three years, a national championship, a UNCAF Cup title, and a CONCACAF Champions Cup title, thus earned a berth at the FIFA Club World Championship Toyota Cup.

Personal life
Ramírez is married to Jeannette Delgado, and they have four children.

References

External links

Profile - Alajuelense
Óscar ¿qué vas hacer? (Bio and career stats) - Nación 

1964 births
Living people
People from Heredia Province
Association football midfielders
Costa Rican footballers
Costa Rica international footballers
1990 FIFA World Cup players
1991 CONCACAF Gold Cup players
1997 Copa América players
L.D. Alajuelense footballers
Deportivo Saprissa players
Belén F.C. players
Liga FPD players
Costa Rican football managers
L.D. Alajuelense managers
Copa Centroamericana-winning players
Costa Rica national football team managers
Copa América Centenario managers
2017 CONCACAF Gold Cup managers
2018 FIFA World Cup managers